Sunny Chan Kam-hung (born 1 January 1967) is a Hong Kong television and film actor.

Career
His film role the 1998 Hong Kong film Hold You Tight was the role that made him well known to the Chinese and East Asian public,  and for which he won the Silver Screen Award for Best Actor at the Singapore International Film Festival in 1998.

Filmography

References

External links

Sunny Chan Kam-Hung at LoveHKFilm

1967 births
Hong Kong male film actors
Hong Kong male actors
Living people
TVB veteran actors
Alumni of The Hong Kong Academy for Performing Arts